Johan Valdemar "Juho" Halme (born Johan Valdemar Eliasson; 24 May 1888, in Helsinki – 1 February 1918, in Helsinki) was a Finnish track and field athlete who competed in the 1908 and 1912 Summer Olympics and won six Finnish championships in various events in 1907–1916. He died during the Finnish Civil War.

Athletics

Olympics 
Halme represented Finland in two Olympic Games.

National 

Halme broke two Finnish records in athletics:
 16 May 1912, javelin throw, 56.54
 16 June 1912, triple jump, 13.95
He also became the second Finn to throw javelin over 60 meters.

He won six gold, seven silver and eight bronze medals at the Finnish Championships in Athletics:

He was the secretary of Helsingin Reipas in 1906–1907 and the chairman of Helsingin Kisa-Veikot in 1909–1918.

Other 

His parents were mason Johan David Eliasson and Amanda Sofia Jusenius. He finnicized his name from Eliasson to Halme in 1905.

Halme was the copy editor of Suomen Urheilulehti in 1912–1917 and the chief executive officer of its publisher Urheilijain Kustannus in 1911–1917.

He wrote the first Finnish language history of a sports club in 1907, on Helsingin Reipas.

Sportswriter Yrjö Halme was his brother. Together they founded the sports almanac Urheilukalenteri.

Death 

Halme had been the manager of sports equipment shop Suomen Urheiluaitta since 1917. On the opening days of the Finnish Civil War, clothing and shoes from their stock was distributed to members of the White Guard fleeing Helsinki. As a retaliation, he was shot on the stairs of the Helsinki Cathedral by Red Guardsmen and died of his wounds in hospital the following day.

See also
 List of Olympians killed in World War I
 Juho Valdemar Halme in War Victims of Finland 1914–1922

References

1888 births
1918 deaths
Athletes from Helsinki
People from Uusimaa Province (Grand Duchy of Finland)
Finnish male triple jumpers
Finnish male javelin throwers
Finnish male shot putters
Olympic athletes of Finland
Athletes (track and field) at the 1908 Summer Olympics
Athletes (track and field) at the 1912 Summer Olympics
People of the Finnish Civil War
19th-century Finnish people
20th-century Finnish people
Olympians killed in warfare